Jeana Ellen Keough (née Myers; formerly Tomasino; born September 18, 1955) is an American television personality, realtor, actress, and model. Keough graduated from Whitnall High School located in Greenfield, Wisconsin in 1972. When she was younger, she worked as a model and actress, including as one of the three beautiful muses in the ZZ Top music videos "Legs", "Sharp Dressed Man" and "Gimme All Your Lovin".  She was also the Playboy Magazine Playmate of the Month in November 1980.

Keough works as a real estate salesperson in Aliso Viejo, California. She is also a former cast member of the reality show The Real Housewives of Orange County.

Family
Keough is divorced from her second husband Matt Keough (1955-2020), a second-generation major league baseball player, pitcher for the Oakland Athletics and a special assistant to Oakland A's general manager. The couple have three children: Shane, Kara and Colton. Their oldest son, Shane is a third-generation professional baseball player, having signed as a minor league outfielder in June 2006 with the Class A affiliate of the Oakland Athletics. Keough was released on July 2, 2010. Daughter Kara married NFL player Kyle Bosworth.

Career
Keough appeared in several movies and television shows in the mid-1980s. As an actress, she has been credited as Jeana Tomasina or Jeana Keough.

Playboy Playmate
Keough was Playboy magazine's Playmate of the Month in November 1980. In 1983, she appeared in "Playboy Video Magazine, Vol. 4." and still makes occasional promotional appearances for Playboy.

Music videos
Along with Danièle Arnaud and fellow Playmate Kymberly Herrin, Keough was one of the three muses in the ZZ Top music videos "Legs", "Sharp Dressed Man", "Gimme All Your Lovin', and "Sleeping Bag".

Reality television
As Jeana Keough, she is one of the original cast members of the reality show, The Real Housewives of Orange County, on the Bravo cable network. In season five, she appeared as a regular cast member in three episodes. Since departing as a full-time member, Keough has appeared as a recurring cast member in season six and has made multiple guest appearances in the later seasons.

Keough was featured as a client on the Bravo series Thintervention with Jackie Warner.

Television

Film

See also
List of people in Playboy 1980–89

References

External links

 Jeana Keough at Playboy Online (Archive) 
 
 

1955 births
Living people
American television actresses
American film actresses
Actresses from Milwaukee
1980s Playboy Playmates
The Real Housewives cast members
21st-century American women